Millennium Station (formerly Randolph Street Terminal; sometimes called Randolph Street station or Randolph/South Water Street station) is a major commuter rail terminal in the Loop (downtown), Chicago. It is the northern terminus of the Metra Electric District to Chicago's southern suburbs, and the western terminus of the South Shore Line to Gary and South Bend, Indiana. 

Located under Millennium Park, the terminal is a stub-end station and was established in the 1800s by the Illinois Central Railroad (IC) and has gone through several re-configurations. Most recently, it was rebuilt in the early 21st century and is owned by Metra through its operating arm, the Northeast Illinois Regional Commuter Railroad Corporation. Not counting commuters on the South Shore Line, over 18,000 people board Metra trains at Millennium Station each day. During peak periods, trains leave the terminal as frequently as twice a minute. It is the third-busiest train station in Chicago.

History 

As Great Central Station, Randolph Street Terminal, along with Van Buren Street a few blocks south, was IC's primary downtown Chicago terminal until the completion in 1893 of Central Station (closed 1972) just south of Grant Park at today's Roosevelt Road.  It still received many trains thereafter, but was of secondary importance. Its importance increased dramatically in 1926 with the electrification of commuter services on IC's main line and its Blue Island and South Chicago branches. Commuter trains from all three branches were now routed into the Randolph Street terminal, while intercity traffic continued to terminate at Central Station.

For many years, the station platforms were exposed and the ticketing facilities and the waiting room were located in the attached facility. The construction of Millennium Park gradually placed the entire station "underground." Randolph Street Station existed in a state of perpetual construction from the mid-1980s until 2005: exposed steel girders covered in flame retardant, unpainted plywood walls, bare concrete floors, and dim utility lights created a notoriously unfriendly, cave-like environment. Skidmore, Owings and Merrill was the architect for the station redesign. With the completion of construction in 2005, the station was renamed Millennium Station. However, many longtime Chicago-area residents still call it "Randolph Street Terminal."

Station layout

The main entrance to the station is at the southwest corner of the intersection of Randolph Street and Michigan Avenue. From the entrance, a concourse lined with shops and restaurants leads to the main waiting area. The waiting area consists of a number of benches and ticket vending machines as well as a ticket counter and information desk for Metra.

From the waiting room, there is a passage to the upper-level South Shore Line platforms, and along this passage is a set of ticket windows for the South Shore Line. At the north end of the South Shore Line platforms, there is a set of ticket vending machines. On the lower level are the Metra tracks, accessed by staircases or ramps from the concourse. The Metra platforms have a secondary exit at Lower South Water Street on the north end.

Bus connections 
CTA
 3 King Drive
 4 Cottage Grove (Owl Service)
 X4 Cottage Grove Express
 6 Jackson Park Express
 19 United Center Express
 20 Madison
 26 South Shore Express
 60 Blue Island/26th
 N66 Chicago (Owl Service)
 124 Navy Pier
 143 Stockton/Michigan Express
 147 Outer DuSable Lake Shore Express
 148 Clarendon/Michigan Express
 151 Sheridan
 157 Streeterville/Taylor

Pace
 855 Plainfield-East Loop Express

ChicaGo Dash
Shuttle Service between Downtown Chicago and Valparaiso (Rush Hour Only)

Pedway connections 
Millennium Station serves as a nexus of several Chicago Pedway connections, which links it to several hotels, residential buildings, office buildings, "L" stations and other notable locations. The pedway itself hosts a number of shops, eateries and services. While some portions of the system remain open at all hours, most close by 7:00 PM on weekdays and 6:00 PM on the weekends, rendering a significant portion of the system unusable during non-business hours.

Westbound corridor 
 Smurfit–Stone Building
 Chicago Cultural Center
 The Heritage at Millennium Park
 Washington/Wabash station
 Macy's
 Lake/State station
 Block 37
 Washington/Dearborn station
 Richard J. Daley Center
 Cook County Building

Eastbound corridor 
 Harris Theater
 Jay Pritzker Pavilion

Northbound corridor 
 Two Prudential Plaza
 Aon Center
 Lakeshore Athletic Club
 Fairmont Hotel
 Park Millennium Condominiums
 Aqua building

Via South Water Street exit 
 Boulevard Towers
 Illinois Center
 Hyatt Regency Chicago
 Columbus Plaza
 Renaissance Hotel
 Swissotel Chicago
 Aqua building

In popular culture 
In the 2008 film The Dark Knight, there is a brief shot where the Batpod is driven through Millennium Station's concourse during a chase scene.

References

External links 

Chicago Millennium Station (Metra Electric)
(Chicago) Millennium Station at Randolph Street (NICTD)
Randolph Street entrance from Google Maps Street View
City of Chicago Millennium Park
Millennium Park map
City of Chicago Loop Community Map

Metra stations in Chicago
Millennium Park
South Shore Line stations in Illinois
Randolph Street
Railway stations in the United States opened in 1856
Railway stations located underground in Illinois
Underground commuter rail